David Guiraud (born 18 November 1992) is a French politician from La France Insoumise. He was elected member of the National Assembly in Nord's 8th constituency in the 2022 French legislative election.

See also 

 List of deputies of the 16th National Assembly of France

References 

1992 births
Living people
Members of Parliament for Nord
Deputies of the 16th National Assembly of the French Fifth Republic
La France Insoumise politicians
21st-century French politicians
Politicians from Paris